The 2012 Challenger Banque Nationale de Granby was a professional tennis tournament played on outdoor hard courts. It was the 19th edition, for men, and 2nd edition, for women, of the tournament and part of the 2012 ATP Challenger Tour and the 2012 ITF Women's Circuit, offering totals of $50,000, for men, and $25,000, for women, in prize money. It took place in Granby, Quebec, Canada between July 16 and July 22, 2012.

Men's singles main-draw entrants

Seeds

1 Rankings are as of July 9, 2012

Other entrants
The following players received wildcards into the singles main draw:
 Philip Bester
 Frank Dancevic
 Pavel Krainik
 Samuel Monette

The following players received entry from the qualifying draw:
 Reid Carleton
 Isade Juneau
 Milan Pokrajac
 Takao Suzuki

Champions

Men's singles

 Vasek Pospisil def.  Igor Sijsling, 7–6(7–2), 6–4

Women's singles

 Eugenie Bouchard def.  Stéphanie Dubois, 6–2, 5–2, retired

Men's doubles

 Philip Bester /  Vasek Pospisil def.  Yuichi Ito /  Takuto Niki, 6–1, 6–2

Women's doubles

 Sharon Fichman /  Marie-Ève Pelletier def.  Shuko Aoyama /  Miki Miyamura, 4–6, 7–5, [10–4]

External links
Official website

Challenger Banque Nationale de Granby
Challenger Banque Nationale de Granby
Challenger de Granby
Challenger Banque Nationale de Granby